Bossiaea kiamensis is a species of flowering plant in the family Fabaceae and is endemic to the south coast of New South Wales. It is an erect or prostrate shrub with narrow elliptic or narrow oblong leaves and yellow and red to brown flowers.

Description
The leaves have a few hairs on the lower surface and the lower surface is paler than the upper surface. The standard petal is yellow-orange with red markings, the wings purplish-brown with red streaks and the keel red is red to dark brown.

Taxonomy and naming
Bossiaea kiamensis was first formally described in 1864 by George Bentham in Flora Australiensis from specimens collected near Kiama.

Distribution and habitat
This bossiaea grows on sandstone on the south coast of New South Wales from the Illawarra region to Milton.

References

kiamensis
Flora of New South Wales
Plants described in 1864
Taxa named by George Bentham